WLEO (1170 AM) is a radio station broadcasting a Spanish Oldies format. Licensed to Ponce, Puerto Rico, it serves the Puerto Rico area. The station is currently owned by the Episcopal Diocese of Puerto Rico.

Ownership

In July 1999, Uno Radio of Ponce Inc., Caguas, P.R. (Jesus M. Soto, chairman) reached an agreement to purchase five radio stations in Puerto Rico from Ponce Broadcasting Corp. (Janero G. Scarano Sr., Julio C. Braum, Luis F. Sala, Catalina Scarano and Sala Business Corp., shareholders) for a reported sale price of $10.75 million.

On 24 December 2019, the Episcopal Diocese of Puerto Rico reached an agreement to purchase WLEO from Uno Radio Group for $1.1 million. The sale was consummated on 29 February 2020.

References

External links

Oldies radio stations in the United States
LEO
Radio stations established in 1956
1956 establishments in Puerto Rico
Anglicanism in Puerto Rico